Candidature of Najeran Independents (in Spanish: Candidatura de Independientes Najerenses) was a political party in Nájera, La Rioja, Spain, led by Jesús López Sáenz. CIN contested the 1983, 1987, 1991 and 1995 municipal elections.

Results:
 1983: 934 votes (28%), 4 seats
 1987: 1172 votes (32%), 4 seats
 1991: 742 votes (21%), 3 seats
 1995: 472 votes (12%), 1 seat

Political parties in La Rioja (Spain)